Eustace Smith (born 14 August 1877, date of death unknown) was a Barbadian cricketer. He played in two first-class matches for the Barbados cricket team in 1897/98.

See also
 List of Barbadian representative cricketers

References

External links
 

1877 births
Year of death missing
Barbadian cricketers
Barbados cricketers
People from Saint George, Barbados